Acleris stadiana is a species of moth of the family Tortricidae first described by William Barnes and August Busck in 1920. It is found in North America, where it has been recorded from Ontario.

The larvae feed on Alnus and Betula species (including Betula alleghaniensis, Betula papyrifera, Betula populifolia).

Taxonomy
The species was formerly treated as a synonym of Acleris semiannula. Adults of these two species are superficially similar, but the taxa differ in genital structure.

References

Moths described in 1920
stadiana
Moths of North America